John Cornelius Asbury (1862–1941) was a lawyer and state legislator in Pennsylvania. A Republican, he served two terms in the Pennsylvania General Assembly in the 1920s and sponsored civil rights bills.

Isaac E. Asbury was his brother. He studied at Washington and Jefferson College and received a law degree from Howard University in 1885. He served in the Pennsylvania House of Representatives from 1921 to 1924. He authored civil rights bills in the Pennsylvania General Assembly and founded Eden Cemetery in Collingdale, Pennsylvania for African Americans.

He married Kate E. Allen in 1886. She died in 1898, and he married Ida Elizabeth Bowser in 1901 and they had a son David Bowser Asbury.

He supported Dowingtown School and Mercy Hospital.

See also
List of African-American officeholders (1900–1959)

References

Members of the Pennsylvania House of Representatives
20th-century African-American politicians
20th-century American politicians
Washington & Jefferson College alumni
Howard University School of Law alumni
Pennsylvania lawyers
1862 births
1941 deaths
African-American state legislators in Pennsylvania
African-American lawyers
African-American men in politics